Patriarch Macarius I may refer to:

 Macarius I of Antioch, Patriarch of Antioch in 656–681
 Macarius of Bulgaria, Patriarch of Bulgaria c. 1278–1282